Eichsfeld I is an electoral constituency (German: Wahlkreis) represented in the Landtag of Thuringia. It elects one member via first-past-the-post voting. Under the current constituency numbering system, it is designated as constituency 1. It comprises the western part of the district of Eichsfeld, including its capital Heilbad Heiligenstadt.

Eichsfeld I was created for the 1994 state election, replacing constituency Heiligenstadt – Worbis II, which covered much of the same area. Since 2019, it has been represented by Thadäus König of the Christian Democratic Union (CDU).

Geography
As of the 2019 state election, Eichsfeld I covers the western part of Eichsfeld district. It comprises the municipalities of Arenshausen, Asbach-Sickenberg, Berlingerode, Birkenfelde, Bodenrode-Westhausen, Bornhagen, Brehme, Burgwalde, Dieterode, Dietzenrode/Vatterode, Ecklingerode, Eichstruth, Ferna, Freienhagen, Fretterode, Geisleden, Geismar, Gerbershausen, Glasehausen, Heilbad Heiligenstadt, Heuthen, Hohengandern, Hohes Kreuz, Kella, Kirchgandern, Krombach, Leinefelde-Worbis (excluding Hundeshagen), Lenterode, Lindewerra, Lutter, Mackenrode, Marth, Pfaffschwende, Reinholterode, Rohrberg, Röhrig, Rustenfelde, Schachtebich, Schimberg, Schönhagen, Schwobfeld, Sickerode, Steinbach, Steinheuterode, Tastungen, Teistungen, Thalwenden, Uder, Volkerode, Wahlhausen, Wehnde, Wiesenfeld, Wingerode, and Wüstheuterode.

Members
The constituency has been held by the Christian Democratic Union since its creation in 1994. Its first representative was Dieter Althaus, who served from 1994 to 2014, followed by Gerold Wucherpfennig (2014–2019) and Thadäus König (2019–present).

Election results

2019 election

2014 election

2009 election

2004 election

1999 election

1994 election

References

Electoral districts in Thuringia
Eichsfeld (district)
1994 establishments in Germany
Constituencies established in 1994